Lewis Padgett was the joint pseudonym of the science fiction authors and spouses Henry Kuttner and C. L. Moore, taken from their mothers' maiden names. They also used the pseudonyms Lawrence O'Donnell and C. H. Liddell, as well as collaborating under their own names.

Writing as 'Lewis Padgett' they were the author of many humorous short stories of science fiction in the 1940s and 1950s. Among the most famous were:

 The "Gallegher" series of stories, collected in Robots Have No Tails (Gnome, 1952):
 "The Proud Robot"
 "Gallegher Plus"
 "The World Is Mine"
 "Ex Machina"
 "Time Locker"
 "Mimsy Were the Borogoves"
 "The Twonky"
 "What You Need"

Adaptations
 "The Twonky" was the inspiration for a radio show recording and a full-length film by the same name.
 Episodes of Tales of Tomorrow and The Twilight Zone were based on the short story "What You Need".
 In 1976, Caedmon Records released a spoken word album of the short story (TC 1509), narrated by William Shatner.
 The feature film The Last Mimzy is loosely based on the short story "Mimsy Were the Borogoves".

Bibliography

As themselves (1937–1956)
 Quest of the Starstone, 1937
 Earth's Last Citadel, 1943
 The Mask of Circe, 1948 (Illustrated by Alicia Austin in 1971)
 Home is the Hunter, 1953
 Or Else, 1953
 A Wild Surmise, 1953
 Home There's No Returning, 1955
 Two-Handed Engine, 1955
 No Boundaries, 1955 (collection)
 Rite of Passage, 1956

As Lewis Padgett (1941–1953)
 A Gnome There Was, 1941
 Piggy Bank, 1942
 Deadlock, 1942
 The Twonky, 1942
 Compliments of the Author, 1942
 Time Locker, 1943
 The Proud Robot, 1943
 Mimsy Were the Borogoves, 1943
 Shock, 1943
 Open Secret, 1943
 The World Is Mine, 1943
 Endowment Policy, 1943
 Gallegher Plus, 1943
 The Iron Standard, 1943
 When the Bough Breaks, 1944
 The Piper's Son, 1945
 Three Blind Mice, 1945
 Camouflage, 1945
 What You Need, 1945
 Line to Tomorrow, 1945
 Beggars in Velvet, 1945
 We Kill People, 1946
 Rain Check, 1946
 The Cure, 1946
 Time Enough, 1946
 The Fairy Chessmen, 1946 (2 parts)
 Chessboard Planet, 1946 (novel)
 Murder in Brass, 1946
The Portal in the Picture, 1946 (novel), later published under the title Beyond Earth's Gates 1949 
 Project, 1947
 Jesting Pilot, 1947
 Margin for Error, 1947
 Tomorrow and Tomorrow, 1947 (2 parts)
 Exit the Professor, 1947
 The Day He Died, 1947 (novel)
 Ex Machina, 1948
 Private Eye, 1949
 The Prisoner in the Skull, 1949
 See You Later, 1949
 Beyond Earth's Gates, 1949 (novel), originally published under the title The Portal in the Picture 1946
 Tomorrow and Tomorrow, 1951 (novel)
 Tomorrow and Tomorrow & The Fairy Chessmen, 1951 (omnibus)
 The Far Reality, 1951 (companion novel to Tomorrow and Tomorrow)
 Robots Have No Tails, 1952 (collection)
 Mutant, 1953
 Humpty Dumpty, 1953
 Epilogue, 1953 (essay)
 Line to Tomorrow and Other Stories of Fantasy and Science Fiction (collection)

As Lawrence O'Donnell (1943–1950) 
 Clash By Night, 1943
 The Children's Hour, 1944
 The Code, 1945
 The Lion and the Unicorn, 1945
 This is the House, 1946
 Vintage Season, 1946
 Fury, 1947
 Promised Land, 1950
 Heir Apparent, 1950
 Paradise Street, 1950

As C. H. Liddell (1950–1953)
 The Sky is Falling, 1950
 Carry Me Home, 1950
 "P.S.'s Feature Flash", 1950 (essay)
 The Odyssey of Yiggar Throlg, 1951
 Android, 1951
 We Shall Come Back, 1951
 Golden Apple, 1951
 The Visitors, 1953

References
Notes

Bibliography

 Clute, John and John Grant. The Encyclopedia of Fantasy. London: Orbit Books, 1997. .
 Clute, John and Peter Nicholls. The Encyclopedia of Science Fiction. London: Orbit Books, 1993. .
 Kuttner, Henry. The Best of Kuttner, Volume 1. London: Mayflower Books Ltd., 1965.
 Kuttner, Henry. The Best of Kuttner, Volume 2. London: Mayflower Books Ltd., 1966.
 Moore Kuttner, Catherine. The Best of Henry Kuttner. New York: Ballantine Books, 1975. . 
 Nicholls, Peter. The Encyclopedia of Science Fiction. St Albans, Hertfordshire, UK: Granada Publishing Ltd., 1979. .

External resources
 
 
 Henry Kuttner at LC Authorities, with 27 records
 C. L. Moore at LC Authorities, with 12 records

20th-century American novelists
American science fiction writers
Science fiction shared pseudonyms
Married couples
20th-century American short story writers